Saint Emmanuel (died c. 304), was arrested and executed at Sirmium, Serbia, with 42 other martyrs, including Quadratus (Codratus) and Theodocius, in 304 as part of Diocletian's persecution of the Christians.  Their feast day is 26 March.

External links
Quadratus (Codratus), Theodosius, Emmanuel & Comp.

304 deaths
[[Category:Year of birth unknown]